Greatest Hits: Live in Amsterdam is a DVD by The Supremes released in 2006.

Background
In 1968 Diana Ross and The Supremes (Mary Wilson and Cindy Birdsong) made a lengthy European tour, playing to capacity audiences at prestigious nightclubs and theatres across the continent.  Many of these shows were filmed by the local television stations and broadcast as prime-time viewing.  The format of the show changed slightly for each country, but was basically the same as the live LP released later that year, Live at London's Talk of the Town.  The concert is a fast-paced mix of the group's biggest hits to date, as well as a collection of showtunes and standards in medley form.

Cindy Birdsong replaced Florence Ballard in summer of 1967, as is featured on the main concert, while Ballard appears on the three bonus tracks

Track listing 
 With a Song in My Heart
 Stranger in Paradise
 Wonderful! Wonderful!
 Unchained Melody
 Without a Song
 Hits Medley: "Stop! In the Name of Love" / "Come See About Me" / "My World Is Empty Without You" / "Baby Love"
 Queen of the House
 More (Theme from Mondo Cane)
 The Happening
 Michelle / Yesterday
 The Lady Is a Tramp / Let's Get Away from It All
 In and Out of Love
 Show Tune Medley: Thoroughly Modern Millie / Second Hand Rose / Mame
 Reflections
 Somewhere (from West Side Story)
 You're Nobody till Somebody Loves You

Bonus tracks 
Filmed October 14, 1964, at the Koninklijk Theater Carré in Amsterdam, Netherlands
 Baby Love
 When the Lovelight Starts Shining Through His Eyes
 Let Me Go the Right Way

Oddments
 The DVD cover incorrectly lists 'Unchained Melody' as 'All My Love'.
 The DVD cover omits "Without a Song" from the track listing

Personnel 
Diana Ross, lead vocals
Mary Wilson, background vocals
Florence Ballard, background vocals
Cindy Birdsong, Background vocals

References 

The Supremes video albums
2006 video albums
Live video albums
Motown video albums
2006 live albums
Motown live albums